St Mary's Cathedral College (SMCC) is a systemic Catholic secondary day school for boys, located in the central business district of Sydney, New South Wales, Australia. Founded in 1824, it is the oldest Catholic school in Australia and among the oldest schools in the country, currently catering for approximately 770 students from Year 3 to Year 12. The college is administered by Sydney Catholic Schools of the Archdiocese of Sydney and operates as a systemic school; it is attached to St Mary's Cathedral. It serves as the choir school for the cathedral, and the choristers of St Mary's Cathedral Choir are drawn from the college. From 1910 until 2016 the college was the responsibility of the Congregation of Christian Brothers and was latterly administered via Edmund Rice Education Australia. It was the last school in Sydney to be served by Christian Brothers as both principal and deputy principal.

History
St Mary's Cathedral College was established in 1824 as an elementary school by the Rev. John Therry. The high school was established in 1828. It is the oldest Catholic school in Australia. The school was conducted by the Christian Brothers and is administered by Sydney Catholic Schools, Eastern Region. The Christian Brothers association with the school dates back to 1911. Catholic education on the same site as St Mary's Cathedral has been continuous since 1824, except during the construction of the existing college buildings and the associated bishop's quarters (1987–1991). Schools on the site have been provided with staff by the Benedictine monks (1824–1882), the Marist Brothers (1883–1910), Sisters of Charity (1883–1967) and the Christian Brothers from 1910.

The replacement of the Marist order by the Christian Brothers in 1911 was controversial. The Marist Brothers had complained to the Archbishop of Sydney, Cardinal Patrick Francis Moran, about their working and living conditions. The cardinal ordered them to leave the college. He directed the Christian Brothers (under threat of interdict) to take over the college in their place, which they did. The cardinal then granted to the Christian Brothers the requests that the Marist Brothers had been denied. The College celebrated 100 years of Christian Brothers administration in 2011. Christian Brother administration of the college ended in 2016 after 105 years.

Co-curricular

The college supports a musical tradition, with close ties to the St Mary's Cathedral Choir, Sydney, and the cathedral liturgies. A music captain is voted in annually to support the music coordinator with music-related activities in the college. It also supports sporting sides in all representative Northeast Conference seasonal/gala day sports and carnivals. At the conclusion of 2021, it was announced by Sydney Catholic Schools that the CBSA (Christian Brothers Sports Association) which the college was involved in for several years would come to a close, creating a new Northeast Conference that the college competes in since 2022. Students at the college have the option to participate in debating, public speaking, mock trial, Duke of Edinburgh Award, and assisting at the Matthew Talbot Hostel in Woolloomooloo.

The school has a Fairtrade program through to Year 10. All students are encouraged to participate in altar serving at the cathedral and to attend Wednesday morning Mass on a weekly basis. Student leadership is of high regard at the college with 11 prefects from Year 12, including a captain and a vice-captain, and other roles dedicated to ministry, administration, and sports houses. Additionally, each year group nominates four to five class captains from each homeroom and two members of the Student Representative Council to represent the form throughout the college.

Principals
 Michael Kelleher (2016 — 2022)
 Kerrie McDiarmid (2023 — present)

Annual events
 College Concert at Sydney Town Hall
 College Swimming Carnival
 College Athletics Carnival
 Edmund Rice Day
 Northeast conference seasonal/gala day sports and carnivals
 CCC (Combined Catholic Colleges) carnivals
 School camps
 Year 11/12 Prefect retreat
 Year 12 retreat

Notable alumni

 Anthony Albanese31st Prime Minister of Australia (2022-present), Leader of the Australian Labor Party and federal member for Grayndler
 James Freemansixth Roman Catholic Archbishop of Sydney
 James Griffinpolitician; Liberal Member for Manly
 Kevin "Horrie" Hastings – former professional rugby league footballer for the Sydney Roosters
 Hunter Page-Lochardactor; Cleverman
 Joe Reaicheformer professional rugby league footballer for the Sydney Roosters, Canterbury Bulldogs and South Sydney Rabbitohs
 Jerry Skotadismidfielder for the Sutherland Sharks and formerly Sydney FC
 Peter Triantiscentral midfielder for the Sydney FC
 Aaron Woodsprofessional rugby league footballer for the Cronulla Sharks

See also 

 List of Catholic schools in New South Wales
 Catholic education in Australia
 List of Christian Brothers schools
 St Mary's Cathedral Choir, Sydney

References

External links 
 

Catholic primary schools in Sydney
Catholic secondary schools in Sydney
Educational institutions established in 1824
Boys' schools in New South Wales
Congregation of Christian Brothers secondary schools in Australia
Cathedral schools
Choir schools
Sydney central business district
1824 establishments in Australia